Jalová is a village and municipality in Snina District in the Prešov Region of north-eastern Slovakia.

History
In historical records the village was first mentioned in 1568.

Geography
The municipality lies at an altitude of 350 metres and covers an area of 2.787 km2. It has a population of about 90 people.

References

External links
 
 
https://web.archive.org/web/20071027094149/http://www.statistics.sk/mosmis/eng/run.html

Villages and municipalities in Snina District
Zemplín (region)